The Westshore RFC (formerly Velox Valhallians R.F.C.) is a rugby union club located in Victoria, British Columbia, on Vancouver Island. The club has the largest junior program on the island and is home to a number of Canadian national men's and women's team players.

Titles
Rounsefell Cup: 0

Notable players
Westshore RFC has produced a number of players who have played representative rugby both in Canada and internationally.

See also
Rugby Canada
British Columbia Rugby Union
BC Premier League

External links
Rugby Canada
British Columbia Rugby Union

Sports teams in Victoria, British Columbia
Rugby union teams in British Columbia
1968 establishments in British Columbia
Rugby clubs established in 1968

fr:British Columbia Rugby Union